Sabarna Roy was born in Calcutta on December 15, 1967. Apart from being an author Sabarna Roy is a trained Civil Engineer who passed out with a First Class Honours Civil Engineering Degree from Jadavpur University and holds the position of Senior Vice President with Electrosteel Group.

He took to creative writing in the year 2007. After that, between 2010 and 2022 he published nine literary books: Pentacles, Frosted Glass, Abyss, Winter Poems, Random Subterranean Mosaic: 2012 – 2018 Time Frozen in Myriad Thoughts, Etchings of the First Quarter of 2020 and Fractured Mosaic, A Marriage, an Affair, and a Friendship and Tara and Sandy Slow Dance of Infinite Stars The nine books were published by Leadstart Publishing. His books cover all genre: prose, poetry, and plays.

Sabarna Roy has also published three technical books, the first being: Articles on Ductile Iron Pipelines and Framework Agreement Contracting Methodology, with his co-authors Rajat Chowdhury and Basanta Bera. This book has been published by Scholar's Press and is a collection of nine articles published in peer-reviewed national and international journals.

Education
Sabarna passed the CBSE Public Examination from Sacred Heart Convent School, Ludhiana in 1982 and Higher Secondary Public Examination from Narendrapur Ramakrishna Mission, Kolkata in 1984. He was a first class honors Civil Engineering graduate from Jadavpur University in 1988.

Career
Sabarna is in the 27th year of his work at Electrosteel Castings Limited.

He has been awarded the Literoma Laureate Award in 2019, Literoma Star Achiever Award 2020, Random Subterranean Mosaic: 2012 – 2018 won the best book of the year 2019, the A List Award for excellence in fiction by the NewsX Media House, Certificate for The Real Super Heroes for spreading a spirit of positivity and hope during the COVID-19 Pandemic from Forever Star India Award 2020, and the Certificate for Participation in the Indo Russian Friendship Celebration 2020, the Literoma Golden Star Award 2020: Lifetime Achievement, and the Certificate of Appreciation for featuring in the Hall of Fame of Literoma International Symposium on Literature & Festival 2020, and the Times Eminent Writer of the Year award by The Times of India Group in Kolkata in February 2021.

Sabarna is one of the winners of the Champions of Change 2020 Award given out by Interactive Forum on Indian Economy supported by Government of India. He is also one of the recipients of Economic Times News Makers 2021 (Eastern Region), Times Excellence Award 2021 in Indian Literature given out by the Times Group, and Professional Excellence Award in the Aqua Excellence Award 2021 given out by the Aqua Foundation.

He was an invited speaker on the opening day at the Noida International Literary Festival (NILF) 2019 and a panelist at the Tata Steel Literary Meet (TSLM) 2020 on the opening day at a session, which discussed the Dark Side of the Mind. He was the Guest of Honor at Aaveg 2021 Literature Festival at Lucknow. He was recently interviewed in the Bhava Samvad series of Kalinga Literature Festival. He has, during the Pandemic, attended many Literary meets, and discussions with Institutions, on various video conferencing platforms.

He has been an invited speaker at various national and international conferences to read his technical expositions on irrigation water, wastewater, industrial water, and various other strategic matters related to policy in the environment sector.

He is a TEDx Speaker, and was invited to the "YathaKatha International Film & Literature Festival" for a Digital Storytelling Session.

Roy is one of the recipients of Top 10 Most Influential Business Leaders of 2021 by Business World. He was recently featured in an international luxury, lifestyle, and business magazine in their publication: Men Leaders 2021 the unconventional path to Leadership and Success on the occasion of International Men’s Day. Roy has also been awarded the Golden Glory Award (GGA) for Critically Acclaimed Bestselling Author of 2021. Sabarna Roy has been awarded the Right Choice Awards for Author of Eminence 2022.

Sabarna Roy has received the Best Author to Watch 2022 Award from Indo-Global Entrepreneurship Conclave Delhi organized by Business Connect, and Best Author in Indian English Literature of 2022 at the Ninth Asia Education Summit 2022. He had received a letter of confirmation from Confederation of International Accreditation Commission [CIAC] Global Foundation stating that he will be receiving an Honorary Doctor of Arts, Honoris Causa from Azteca University, Mexico for his contribution to post-modern Indian writing in English. Later Azteca University, Mexico conferred an Honorary Doctor of Arts to Sabarna Roy for his contribution to Post-modern Indian Literature. Sabarna has received the Most Iconic Author of the Year, 2022 from the Government of Punjab.

Bibliography
 
Pentacles comprises one novella and four long narrative poems.

 
Frosted Glass comprises one story cycle consisting of 14 stories and one poem cycle consisting of 21 poems. 

 
Abyss is a full length play in two acts with an interval in between. It is essentially a crime thriller full of suspense.

 
The poems contained in this collection, were inspired by the relatively mild season that prevails in Kolkata following the season of festivities, the Durga and Kali Puja, and portray myriad shades of human life. 

 
It is a kaleidoscope of random, yet structured to a pattern, fiction, semi-autobiographical, and autobiographical pieces, covering poems, short-shorts, opinions, observations, and conversations.

 
It comprises a novella and a poem cycle. The novella deals with dualism of life and the poem cycle is a duel between the poet and his alter-ego.

 
Fractured Mosaic, essentially a sequel to Sabarna Roy’s fifth book titled: Random Subterranean Mosaic: 2012 – 2018, is yet another kaleidoscope from Sabarna Roy’s arsenal that will take the readers to a whirlpool of myriad thoughts.

 
This is a story where Rahul, Paromita, Suroma, and Samaresh bisect and intersect boundaries of marriage, affair and friendship, evolving into an intriguing cocktail and mix of human relationship.

 
The story of two lonely adults seeking a connection that kindles from their well-lived lives after school days reminiscences and glides around the suggestive slow burn crackling with sexual chemistry is interestingly narrated in this epistolary novel.

Technical publication
 
Articles on Ductile Iron Pipelines and Framework Agreement Methodology authored by Sabarna Roy, Rajat Chowdhury and Basanta Bera and published by Scholars' Press, Stabu Street 15-141, Riga, LV-1010 Latvia, European Union, which has been translated into 8 major European languages.

 
Technological Trends in Water Sector for a Sustainable Solution authored by Sabarna Roy and Kaustav Ray Chaudhury describes the emerging technologies in the field of water, wastewater and irrigation.

 
This is a practicing manual for the critical thinkers in the field of environment dealing with water, wastewater, and irrigation.

References 

Living people
English-language writers from India
English-language poets
Indian male poets
Indian male novelists
1967 births
 Writers from Kolkata